Ralph Lavers (7 September 1907 – 8 March 1969) was a British painter. His work was part of the painting event in the art competition at the 1948 Summer Olympics.

References

1907 births
1969 deaths
20th-century British painters
British male painters
Olympic competitors in art competitions
People from Broken Hill, New South Wales
20th-century British male artists